The Bigler Nunataks are a cluster of notable nunataks in Antarctica. They lie southeastward of Pomerantz Tableland between Keim Peak and Lovejoy Glacier. They were mapped by the United States Geological Survey from surveys and from U.S. Navy aerial photographs, 1960–62, and named by the Advisory Committee on Antarctic Names for John C. Bigler, United States Antarctic Research Program biologist at McMurdo Station, 1966–67.

References
 

Nunataks of Oates Land